Yes, My Darling Daughter is a 1939 American screwball comedy film directed by William Keighley and starring Priscilla Lane. Ellen Murray (Priscilla Lane) is a young woman determined to spend a weekend with her lover, Douglas Hall (Jeffrey Lynn) before he takes off to Europe for his new job.

Plot summary

Cast
 Priscilla Lane as Ellen Murray
 Jeffrey Lynn as Douglas 'Doug' Hall
 Roland Young as Titus 'Jay' Jaywood
 Fay Bainter as Ann 'Annie' Murray
 May Robson as Granny Whitman
 Genevieve Tobin as Aunt Connie Nevins
 Ian Hunter as Lewis Murray
 Robert Homans as Police Sergeant Murphy
 Edward Gargan as Dayfield Motorcycle Policeman
 Spencer Charters as Angus Dibble
 Lottie Williams as Martha, the Maid
 Paul Panzer as Peter (scenes deleted)
 George Tobias as Dock Worker (uncredited)
 Clem Bevans as Henry (baggage man) (uncredited)
 John Harron as Belga Line Steward (uncredited)
 Vera Lewis as Mrs. Dibble (uncredited)
 Jack Richardson as Husband Leaving Train (uncredited)
 Rosella Towne as Edith Colby (uncredited)

References

External links 
 
 
 

1939 films
1930s screwball comedy films
Films directed by William Keighley
Films scored by Heinz Roemheld
American films based on plays
American black-and-white films
1939 comedy films
Warner Bros. films
1930s English-language films